Chinese football clubs has participated in Asian association football competitions (AFC Champions League/Asian Club Championship and the Asian Cup Winners' Cup) and other international competitions (FIFA Club World Cup and A3 Champions Cup) since 1985, when the Asian Club Championship returned to Asia for the first time in 14 years.

Liaoning is the first club who won the Asian champion in 1990, and Guangzhou Evergrande is the most successful club with 2 AFC Champions League titles. Defunct club Dalian Shide also got a runners-up in 1997–98 Asian Club Championship.

Qualification rules

Multiple Asian and worldwide competition winners from China

Full Asian record

AFC Champions League/Asian Club Championship 

Chinese teams have won the competition 3 times and reached the final on 2 other occasions.

Asian Cup Winners' Cup 

The Asian Cup Winners' Cup was an association football competition run by the Asian Football Confederation (AFC). The competition was started in 1991 as a tournament for all the domestic cup winners from countries affiliated to the AFC. The winners of the Cup Winners Cup used to contest the Asian Super Cup against the winners of the Asian Champions' Cup. The most successful clubs in the competition are Al Hilal from Saudi Arabia and Nissan FC from Japan. In 2002, it merged with the Asian Clubs Championship to form the AFC Champions League.

Chinese team Dalian Shide reached the final in the season of 2000-01.

A3 Champions Cup 

A3 Champions Cup (also known as East Asian Champions Cup) was an annual football (soccer) tournament jointly organized by the China PR, Japan and Korea Republic football Association. It began in 2003, involving the league champions of China, Japan and South Korea. The host nation also invited an additional team, making this a four team tournament.

Chinese team Shanghai Shenhua won the competition in 2007.

Full international record

FIFA Club World Cup 

Chinese team Guangzhou Evergrande has won 2 AFC Champions League titles in 2013 and 2015, which made them qualifying to the FIFA Club World Cup as the representative of Asian clubs. In the 2013 FIFA Club World Cup, they entered in the quarterfinals, beating the African champions Al Ahly 2–0. In the semi-finals, they were defeated by the European champions Bayern Munich 3–0. In the third place match, the club lost against South American champions Atlético Mineiro 3–2 and finished in fourth place. In the 2015 FIFA Club World Cup, Guangzhou won 2–1 against Club América in the quarterfinals before losing 3–0 against Barcelona in the semi-finals. At the end, Guangzhou lost the third place match 2–1 against Hiroshima Sanfrecce, ending up in the same position as in the 2013 edition.

References 

Football in China